Torkeh, also rendered as Torgeh, may refer to:
 Torkeh-ye Olya
 Torkeh-ye Sofla, Dalahu
 Torkeh-ye Sofla, Javanrud